Alec Jason (born Alexander Jason on 13 July 1911 in London - died 2 October 2000 in Los Angeles) was an English actor. He is the father of Harvey Jason and he was married to Marie Goldblatt until her death.

Filmography 
 Bis ans Ende der Welt (1991) ... as Narcotics Agent
 Midnight Caller
 episode The Language Barrier ... as Grady
 episode Do You Believe in Miracles? ... as Uniform No.1
 Dr. Minx (1975) ... as Motel Owner
 The Specialist (1975) ... as Witness
 I Wonder Who's Killing Her Now? ... as Dr. DeHart

External links
 

1911 births
2000 deaths
English male film actors
English male television actors
20th-century English male actors
English expatriates in the United States